Anthony LaPanta is a sports personality with Bally Sports North.

Biography
LaPanta is the host of Twins Live, a pregame/postgame show for the Minnesota Twins and the TV voice of the Minnesota Wild. He was hired by the franchise in 2012. He has covered Twin Cities sports since 1991. He has also served as a fill in play-by-play voice for the Minnesota Golden Gophers men's hockey team and the Minnesota Twins and the Minnesota Timberwolves. He was the voice of the St. Paul Saints for ten years before joining Fox Sports North. He has won two Emmy Awards; one for play-by-play; the other for hosting/anchoring. His partner for Wild telecasts is either Mike Greenlay, Ryan Carter, Wes Walz, Lou Nanne, or Krissy Wendell. LaPanta is a graduate of Totino-Grace High School in Fridley, Minnesota and St. John's University in Collegeville, Minnesota.

References
http://www.foxsportsnorth.com/05/15/12/Anthony-LaPanta-named-Minnesota-Wild-tel/landing_wild/html?blockID=729360
http://focus.mnsun.com/2012/05/24//totino-grace-hs-alum-to-become-wild-play-by-play-announcer
http://www.stateofhockeynews.com/2012-articles/may/minnesota-wild-slap-fans-in-the-face-with-hiring-of-anthony-lapanta.html
http://www.linkedin.com/pub/anthony-lapanta/13/b85/361
http://www.foxsportsnorth.com/pages/anthony_lapanta_index/
http://www.hockeywilderness.com/2012/5/15/3022302/minnesota-wild-hire-anthony-lapanta-for-vox-despite-backlash-fans

Living people
People from Saint Paul, Minnesota
People from Minneapolis
American television sports anchors
American television sports announcers
Minnesota Wild announcers
Minnesota Timberwolves announcers
Minnesota Twins announcers
National Hockey League broadcasters
National Basketball Association broadcasters
Major League Baseball broadcasters
College hockey announcers in the United States
Year of birth missing (living people)